Matt Robson (born 1950) is a New Zealand politician.

Matthew, Matt or Matty Robson may refer to:

Matt Robson (footballer, born 1887) (1887 – after 1919), English footballer who played for Lincoln City
Matt Robson (footballer, born 1954), English footballer who played for Darlington
Matty Robson (born 1985), English footballer who played for Hartlepool United and Carlisle United
Matthew Robson (rugby union) (1908–1983), England national rugby union player